The Beano Annual is the current name of the book that has been published every year since 1939, to tie in with the children's comic The Beano.  there have been 84 editions. The annuals are traditionally published in July or August, in time for Christmas, and since 1965 they have had the date of the following year on the cover. Before then no date was given.

From 1943 to 1950 the annual was called "The Magic-Beano Book", which referred to the short-lived Magic Comic that had ceased publication in 1941 due to the Second World War's paper rationing. The name reverted to the original title of "The Beano Book" in 1950 and continued, the year changing for each subsequent annual, until the release of the 2003 book in 2002 when it was renamed "The Beano Annual". The 2011 Beano Annual is taller and wider than previous annuals.

After paper rationing had ended, The Magic Comic was never revived, but some of the characters who had originally appeared in the pre-war Magic Comic remained as regular strips in the post-1950 Beano Comic (such as Koko the Pup).

Because of his popularity, Dennis the Menace has appeared on the front cover of every annual since the release of the 1979 book in 1978.

The latest version came out 2021 and was dated 2022. The book consistently retails at 6.98 from 2022 (released 2021)

List of annuals

This information is necessary to identify older annuals which are not dated. If an annual is dated 1940, it would have been published in August 1939. 

Prices are in shillings and pence with one shilling (1/-) equal to 5p. Modern equivalent prices (not inflation-adjusted) are given in brackets.

The Beano Book (1940-1942)

The Magic-Beano Book (1943-1950)

The Beano Book (1951-2002)

The Beano Annual (2003-present)

Since the Beano's redesigned logo debuted on the 2017 annual (released 2016), the words "BEANO" and "ANNUAL (year)" have been displayed in a consistent size and font on the cover and spine each year; this had not previously been the case.

See also
List of Beano comic strips by annual
List of DC Thomson publications

References

External links
Beano Annual Gallery

Comics anthologies
DC Thomson Comics titles
British children's books
The Beano
British comics
1939 comics debuts
Publications established in 1939